Warfare in the Qur’an is a 2012 book on the Islamic ethics of war by New Zealand-born British scholar of strategic studies, Joel Hayward.

Summary

This book outlines and examines what the Qur'an says about the purpose, nature, and morality of war. It is Book 14 in the MABDA English Series, published in Amman, Jordan, by the Royal Islamic Strategic Studies Centre in conjunction with the Royal Aal al-Bayt Institute for Islamic Thought.

Bosnian translation 

In 2022, a Bosnian translation was published: Etika rata u islamu (Tuzla: Dialogos, 2022. ISBN: 978-9926-8652-2-1).

References 

2012 non-fiction books
English non-fiction books
Biographies of Muhammad
English-language books
Life of Muhammad
Books by Joel Hayward